Cologne Pride or Cologne Gay Pride (formerly: Christopher Street Day Cologne) is one of the largest gay and lesbian organised events in Germany and one of the biggest in Europe. Its origin is to celebrate the pride in Gay and Lesbian Culture.

Cologne Gay Pride is made of a large city Gay pride parade, and a week of a number of festivals, parties and political forums. The parade and festivals are comparable to carnival celebrations and the political motivation of the event did achieve a lot in equal rights and gay rights.

Cologne Gay Pride takes place annually in Cologne, Germany.

History 

Cologne Gay Pride started during the 1980s as a small Christopher Street Day named for the Stonewall riots on Christopher Street in New York City. Within a liberal political culture in former West Germany the Christopher Street Day grew into one of the biggest celebration events in Germany. Education and support for AIDS became an important aspect during recent years. In 2002 Cologne Pride was also Europride a joint European event.

In July 2014, there were 700,000 participants.

See also 
 LGBT rights in Germany

References

External links 
 Cologne Pride

Pride parades in Germany
Festivals in Cologne
Tourist attractions in Cologne